The 1971–72 Sussex County Football League season was the 47th in the history of Sussex County Football League a football competition in England.

Division One

Division One featured 14 clubs which competed in the division last season, along with two new clubs, promoted from Division Two:
Bognor Regis Town
Burgess Hill Town

League table

Division Two

Division Two featured 14 clubs which competed in the division last season, along with two new clubs, relegated from Division One:
Seaford Town
Sidley United

League table

References

1971-72
S